Ictericodes is a genus of the family Tephritidae, better known as fruit flies.

Species
Ictericodes cashmerensis (Hendel, 1927)
Ictericodes changhyoi Kwon, 1985
Ictericodes depuncta (Hering, 1936)
Ictericodes japonicus (Wiedemann, 1830)
Ictericodes maculatus (Shiraki, 1933)
Ictericodes zelleri (Loew, 1844)

References

Tephritinae
Tephritidae genera
Diptera of Europe
Diptera of Asia